Brave Girls (also known as B. Girls or BG) was a South Korean girl group formed and produced by Brave Brothers in 2011 through Brave Entertainment. After making their debut with the single album The Difference on April 7, 2011, the group has released six extended plays, including Back to da Future (2011), Re-Issue (2012), High Heels (2016), Rollin' (2017), Summer Queen (2021), and Thank You (2022). 

Initially a quintet, the group underwent multiple lineup changes, with their final line-up becoming their most well-known, consisting of Minyoung, Yujeong, Eunji, and Yuna. In 2021, the group gained a huge spike in popularity after their song "Rollin'" (2017) unexpectedly went viral.

History

Pre-debut
On September 21, 2010, Brave Brothers revealed he is launching a new 4-member hip-hop girl group called Brave Girls.On March 14, 2011, Eunyoung was revealed as the leader of Brave Girls. She is the niece of Shin Ha-kyun, an actor known for his roles in Welcome to Dongmakgol and Sympathy for Lady Vengeance. Hyeran was then revealed on March 17 and gained attention due to her resemblance to singer Son Dambi and old dance rehearsal videos that led to her name being featured on video sites like Mgoon. Yejin also gained attention due to the fact that she was 'Miss Seattle' at the Miss Korea 2008 competition, and because she bears a resemblance to actress Kim Sa-rang. Seo-a also gained attention for her previous career as a model for various magazines and commercials.

2011–2015: Debut, Back to da Future, Re-Issue and hiatus

On March 31, 2011, Brave Brothers released two teaser images of the group, revealing the two concepts that the group would perform with. On April 7, they released their debut single album The Difference, along with a music video for title track "Do You Know". They then had their debut performance on KBS's Music Bank with promotional tracks "So Sexy" and "Do You Know". A music video for "So Sexy" was released on July 10.

On July 28, Brave Girls released the lead single from their debut mini-album Back to da Future titled "Easily", which features Korean reggae artist Skull, and its music video. Brave Brothers stated that the song was homage to Kim Gun-mo's "Excuse". The full EP was released on July 29 and peaked at number 14 on the Gaon Album Chart, selling 1,606 copies. At the 19th Korea Culture Entertainment Awards which was held on December 15, the group received the "Rookie of the Year" award.

On February 22, 2012, Brave Girls released their second mini-album Re-Issue and held a promotional showcase for the album that included a guest performance from Teen Top. The EP peaked at #14 on the Gaon Album Chart. The title song "Nowadays" charted highly on charts and became one of the most searched topics on Korean websites. On August 31, 2013, Brave Girls released a single titled "For You". In February 2014, Brave Brothers reported that he was going to be working on a full-length album for the group, but the album was put on hold indefinitely due to his working with AOA. Brave Girls remained inactive for the following two years.

===2016–2020: Lineup changes, High Heels and Rollin===

After a -year hiatus, it was announced that Brave Girls would be making a comeback as a seven-member group, with two original members (Yoojin and Hyeran) and five new members (Minyoung, Yujeong, Eunji, Yuna, and Hayun). The group released a digital single titled "Deepened" on February 16. On June 19, Brave Girls released their third mini-album High Heels and the music video for its title track "High Heels". On September 1, the group released a digital single titled "Yoo-hoo".

On January 13, 2017, it was announced that members Yoojin and Hyeran, the two remaining original members, would stop promotions with the group. Member Yoojin decided to quit the group after she got her Degree in Theater from Chung-Ang University. Meanwhile, member Hyeran would take a hiatus due to health concerns. It was noted that no new members would be added, and Brave Girls would continue promotions as a five-member group with members Minyoung, Yujeong, Eunji, Yuna and Hayun for a possible return in February or March with a new release. The group released their fourth mini album Rollin' and the lead single of the same name on March 7. In October 2017, members Yujeong, Eunji, and Yuna participated in the idol rebooting show The Unit which premiered on October 28. Yujeong and Eunji passed the audition. Eunji was eliminated in 45th place during the first elimination round while Yujeong was eliminated in 37th place during the second elimination round.

On August 11, 2018, the group released "Rollin' (New Version)", a rearranged version of the single of the same name released in 2017, as a gift to fans for their passionate support for the song in the prior year and a half. It was also announced that the group will promote as a 4-member piece for the time being, since member Hayun will take a break due to health reasons.

On August 14, 2020, Brave Girls returned after almost three years with a four-member lineup, including Minyoung, Yujeong, Eunji and Yuna, by releasing a digital single titled "We Ride". Later in 2020, the group was featured in a webtoon series produced by Toontori and supported by the Ministry of Culture, Sports and Tourism of South Korea. They were one of eight groups selected as part of the 2020 Hallyu Linked Support Project hosted by the Korea International Cultural Exchange Promotion Agency in association with Korea's Webtoon Industry Association.

===2021–2023: Mainstream breakthrough, Summer Queen, After 'We Ride''', Thank You, and disbandment===
In February 2021, a compilation video of Brave Girls performing "Rollin'" became viral on YouTube. As a result, the song gained a surge in popularity and rose to the top of real-time music charts. In response, the group resumed promotional activities for the song. Member Yujeong revealed that prior to the song becoming viral, the group was near disbandment as she and fellow member Yuna had already moved out of their dorm. On March 12, "Rollin'" achieved its first perfect all-kill (PAK) after topping both the daily and real-time components of the South Korean music ranking aggregator . 

On March 14, Brave Girls received their first music show win on Inkigayo with "Rollin'" 1,854 days after the group's debut date, which at the time was the longest time period between debut and first win for any girl group, a record later surpassed by Dreamcatcher, who received their first win 1,923 days after debut. Brave Girls received their second win a few days later on The Show. Brave Girls' newfound popularity also drew attention to "We Ride", which returned to the Gaon Digital Chart at number 115, eventually peaking at number four.

On April 29, Brave Girls released a special version of "High Heels" in collaboration with shoe brand Elcanto. On May 5, they released a promotional single titled "Red Sun" as an advertisement for Lotte Department Store. On June 17, the group released their fifth extended play Summer Queen and its lead single "Chi Mat Ba Ram". The album peaked at number 3 on the Gaon Album Chart and the song peaked at the same position on the Gaon Digital Chart. 
 
 
 
 
 
 
 
 
 
 

On August 23, Brave Girls released the repackaged version of their fifth extended play After 'We Ride with the lead single of the same name.

On January 14, 2022, it was announced that Minyoung would be suspending her activities temporarily due to poor health conditions.

On March 14, Brave Girls made their comeback with their sixth extended play Thank You and its lead single of the same name.

In May, it was announced that Brave Girls would hold a concert in the United States in July 2022. On May 17, Brave Entertainment announced that Brave Girls would release a new single that reinterprets Brown Eyed Girls 2008 hit "How Come". It was released on music streaming platforms on May 23.

On February 15, 2023, Brave Girls announced their plans to release a new single "Goodbye", which lead to speculation that the group was intending on disbanding after their contract expiration. It was subsequently confirmed by Brave Entertainment that the group would disband after all four members chose not to renew their contracts with the company. "Goodbye", their final song, was released on the same day. The following day, Minyoung assured fans that the group's disbandment would be temporary, and that they would eventually reunite in the future.

Past members
 Minyoung (민영)
 Yujeong (유정)
 Eunji (은지)
 Yuna (유나)
 Eunyoung (은영)
 Seo-a (서아)
 Yejin (예진)
 Yoojin (유진)
 Hyeran (혜란)
 Hayun (하윤)

 Timeline 

 Blue (vertical) = album release
 Red (horizontal) = 1st generation
 Orange (horizontal) = 2nd generation
 Black (horizontal) = inactive

Discography

Extended plays
 Back to da Future (2011)
 Re-Issue (2012)
 High Heels (2016)
 Rollin' (2017)
 Summer Queen (2021)
 Thank You'' (2022)

Filmography

Television shows

Web shows

Awards and nominations

Ambassadorship

References

External links

 Official website 

Musical groups established in 2011
K-pop music groups
South Korean dance music groups
South Korean girl groups
South Korean hip hop groups
Brave Entertainment artists
2011 establishments in South Korea
Musical groups disestablished in 2023
2023 disestablishments in South Korea